The Campeonato Carioca de Futebol Feminino (Carioca Women's Football Championship, in English), organized by the Rio de Janeiro State Football Federation (FFERJ) is the women's football state championship of Rio de Janeiro State, and is contested since 1983.

The four most important Rio de Janeiro Men's football teams (Vasco da Gama, Flamengo, Botafogo and Fluminense) contested  in all editions of the competition between 1995 and 2000. In 2006, the four most important Rio de Janeiro clubs did not dispute the competition, and in 2007 only Botafogo participated of the competition.

Two unofficial competitions were also contested, Torneio de Rio das Ostras (Rio das Ostras Tournament, in English), which had Flamengo as the champion of the only edition disputed, in 1999, and Torneio Início (Start Tournament, in English) which had Vasco da Gama winning in 1999 and 2000, the only editions of the tournament.

List of champions

Campeonato Carioca de Futebol Feminino

Torneio de Rio das Ostras

Torneio Início

References
Campeonato Carioca de Futebol Feminino at RSSSF
2006 season at FFERJ official website (in .doc format)
2007 season at FFERJ official website

Women's football leagues in Brazil
Women